Arthur Delancey "Dan" Ayrault Jr. (January 21, 1935 – February 24, 1990) was an American competitive rower and two-time Olympic gold medalist. While competing at the 1956 Summer Olympics in Melbourne, Australia, Ayrault won a gold medal in coxed pair with Conn Findlay and Kurt Seiffert. During the 1960 Summer Olympics in Rome, Italy, he earned a gold medal in coxless four. Ayrault's teammates were Ted Nash, John Sayre, and Rusty Wailes.

Early life and education

Ayrault was born in Long Beach, California on January 21, 1935. He graduated from the Morristown School (now Morristown-Beard School) in Morristown, New Jersey in 1952. Morristown-Beard School inducted Ayrault into their Athletics Hall of Fame in 1986. In 1956, he earned his bachelor's degree in philosophy at Stanford University. During his time at Stanford, Ayrault served as captain of the Cardinals' rowing team. Stanford's Department of Athletics later inducted Aryault into the school's Hall of Fame. He completed his master's degree at Harvard University in Cambridge, Massachusetts.

Teaching career

Following his rowing career, Ayrault taught at Lakeside School in Seattle, Washington. After Lakeside School named him as their headmaster in 1969, he served in that role until 1990. In 1971, Ayrault guided the merger of Lakeside School (then an all-boys school) with the all-girls St. Nicholas School. During his 21-year tenure with Lakeside School, Ayrault oversaw funding campaigns to construct Pigott Memorial Library, a field house, and St. Nicholas Hall for Humanities and Arts. Students who attended Lakeside during that period included Bill Gates and Paul Allen, the co-founders of Microsoft Corporation. In 1980, the Washington State Association for Supervision and Curriculum Development awarded Ayrault their Outstanding Educator award.

Military service

Ayrault's father served with the U.S. Navy during World War II. Ayrault later received the Legion of Merit for his service commanding the ship.

Community service

In 1958, Ayrault co-founded the Lake Washington Rowing Club. He then supported the rowing club during the next 32 years. Ayrault served as the president and chairman of the Pacific Science Center between 1980 and 1984. He also served as a member of the board of directors of the Seattle Chamber Music Society and the George Pocock Rowing Foundation.  The foundation established their Ayrault Fund in honor of Ayrault. The Ayrault Fund facilitates the foundation's outreach activities to promote the sport of rowing.

Ayrault Memorial Lecture Series

In 1994, friends and family members of Ayrault endowed the Ayrault Memorial Lecture Series at Lakeside School in his honor. Notable speakers at the lecture series have included:

 Bill Gates
 Jacob Lawrence, a painter
 Gwendolyn Knight, a painter
 Dale Chihuly, a glass sculptor
 Fay Jones, an artist
 August Wilson, a playwright
 Sylvia Earle, an oceanographer
 Russ Mittermeier, a primatologist and herpetologist
 Rudy Crew, an educator and administrator
 Margaret Larson, a broadcast journalist with and correspondent with Dateline NBC  
 Claude Steele, a social psychologist
 Paul Loeb, an animal trainer and author
 Brian Greene, a physicist
 Speight Jenkins, general director of the Seattle Opera    
 David Brooks, an author and columnist for The New York Times
 Po Bronson, a journalist and author

References

1935 births
1990 deaths
Stanford Cardinal rowers
Olympic gold medalists for the United States in rowing
Rowers at the 1956 Summer Olympics
Rowers at the 1960 Summer Olympics
20th-century American educators
American male rowers
Stanford University School of Humanities and Sciences alumni
Harvard University alumni
Medalists at the 1960 Summer Olympics
Medalists at the 1956 Summer Olympics
Morristown-Beard School alumni
People from Long Beach, California